The Association des Scouts du Burundi, the national Scouting organization of Burundi, was founded in 1940, and became a member of the World Organization of the Scout Movement in 1979. The coeducational Association des Scouts du Burundi has 32,340 members as of 2020.

The Scout program is oriented towards rural needs of the population which includes farming, reforestation, erosion control, and village health.

Program sections
Louveteaux (Cub Scouts) - ages 7 to 11
Eclaireurs (Scouts) - ages 12 to 15
Routiers (Rover Scouts) - ages 16 to 19

The Scout Motto is Uwe Tayari, Be Prepared in Swahili, Ube Maso in Kirundi, and Sois Prêt in French.

See also
Association des Guides du Burundi
6th Africa Scout Jamboree 2012

References

External links
Association des Scouts du Burundi

World Organization of the Scout Movement member organizations
Scouting and Guiding in Burundi
Youth organizations established in 1940
1940 establishments in Ruanda-Urundi